

The Bartel BM 1 Maryla, originally Bartel M.1 was a fighter aircraft design for the Polish military that did not advance beyond the design stage. It was designed in response to a Polish War Ministry competition in 1925 and was placed third, netting Bartel a zł 1,000 prize.  Maryla was the name of Bartel's wife.   The design was a single-seat parasol-wing monoplane similar in configuration to the Nieuport-Delage sesquiplanes of the era. A distinctive feature were Y-shaped struts joining wing with an undercarriage.  It was not built.

Specifications (as designed)

References

Further reading
 

1920s Polish fighter aircraft
BM-1
Parasol-wing aircraft
Single-engined tractor aircraft